Farooq Rind is a Pakistani television director, he is best known for his drama serials Sanjha, Rishtay Kuch Adhooray Se, Mere Meherbaan and telefilm Nao Main Darya which earned him several awards and nominations. He won Hum Award for Best Director Drama Serial for the serial Sanjha.

Filmography

Dramas
 Saraab 
 Qurbat 
 Besharam
 Diya Jalaye Rakhna
 Sanjha
 Laa
 Rishtay Kuch Adhooray Se
 Mere Meherbaan
 Mandi 
 Jugnoo 
 Gul-e-Rana
 Baaghi
 Pukaar
 Ishq Zahe Naseeb 
 Pyar Ke Sadqay
 Mohabbat tum sa Nafrat hai
 Hum kahan ke sachay thay

Short films
 Kaan Ras (2005)
 Chaand Aein Mani (2006) 
 Insanon Jaise Log (2007)
 Daani

Telefilms
 Saans Le Aey Zindagi 
 Nao Main Darya (2007)
 Aseen Manhu (Sindhi Solo Play)
 Dharu (Sindhi Play)

Awards and nominations
 (2013) - 2nd Hum Awards: Hum Award for Best Director Drama Serial - Rishtay Kuch Adhooray Se. won 
 (2014) - 3rd Hum Awards: Hum Award for Best Director Drama Serial - Mere Meherbaan. nom

Lux Style Awards

References

External links
 Farooq Rind Official Website
 Farooq Rind Biography on Video Pakistan
 

.

Living people
Male actors from Karachi
Pakistani male television actors
Pakistani television directors
Year of birth missing (living people)